Aleksandra Ruchkina (born 1 July 1997 in Kaliningrad, Russia) is a Russian Paralympic athlete. At the 2020 Summer Paralympics, she won a silver medal at the Long jump T20 for intellectually impaired athletes.

References

Living people
1997 births
Paralympic medalists in athletics (track and field)
Medalists at the World Para Athletics Championships
Medalists at the World Para Athletics European Championships
Athletes (track and field) at the 2020 Summer Paralympics
Paralympic silver medalists for the Russian Paralympic Committee athletes
Medalists at the 2020 Summer Paralympics
Russian female long jumpers
Sportspeople from Kaliningrad
21st-century Russian women